Dean Cannon (born August 2, 1968, in Bitburg Air Base, Germany) is an attorney and government affairs consultant. Cannon served in the House of Representatives of the Florida Legislature from 2004 to 2012, serving as Speaker of the House from 2010 to 2012.  Cannon currently serves as president and chief executive officer of 250+ attorney/consultant legal and lobbying firm, GrayRobinson, P.A.

Cannon received both his bachelor's degree and Juris Doctor from the University of Florida. While there, Cannon served as student body president and vice president of Florida Blue Key. A fifth-generation Floridian, Cannon began his career as a lawyer in Orlando, practicing state and local government law beginning in 1995.

During his eight-year tenure at the Florida House of Representatives, Cannon addressed property tax reform, growth management reform, health care and Medicaid reform, and transportation infrastructure policy initiatives. He was selected by his peers to become Speaker of the House for the 2010 to 2012 term.

Following his time in office, Cannon opened lobbying firm Capitol Insight, which then merged with GrayRobinson in 2016.

In addition to serving as president and managing director of GrayRobinson, Cannon serves on the board of directors for the Orlando Economic Partnership, Enterprise Florida, and Space Florida.

Cannon currently resides in Tallahassee, Florida, with his family.

References

External links 
Official Dean Cannon Website
Florida House of Representatives
 

|-

Fredric G. Levin College of Law alumni
Republican Party members of the Florida House of Representatives
1968 births
Living people
Speakers of the Florida House of Representatives
21st-century American politicians